The 1962–63 NBA season was the Lakers' 15th season in the NBA and third season in Los Angeles.

Roster

Regular season

Season standings

x – clinched playoff spot

Record vs. opponents

Game log

Playoffs

|- align="center" bgcolor="#ccffcc"
| 1
| March 31
| St. Louis
| W 112–104
| Jerry West (27)
| Elgin Baylor (12)
| Elgin Baylor (8)
| Los Angeles Memorial Sports Arena10,086
| 1–0
|- align="center" bgcolor="#ccffcc"
| 2
| April 2
| St. Louis
| W 101–99
| Elgin Baylor (29)
| three players tied (14)
| Baylor, Selvy (6)
| Los Angeles Memorial Sports Arena11,225
| 2–0
|- align="center" bgcolor="#ffcccc"
| 3
| April 4
| @ St. Louis
| L 112–125
| Elgin Baylor (34)
| Elgin Baylor (12)
| three players tied (2)
| Kiel Auditorium7,396
| 2–1
|- align="center" bgcolor="#ffcccc"
| 4
| April 6
| @ St. Louis
| L 114–124
| Jerry West (33)
| Baylor, Ellis (13)
| three players tied (2)
| Kiel Auditorium10,614
| 2–2
|- align="center" bgcolor="#ccffcc"
| 5
| April 7
| St. Louis
| W 123–96
| Elgin Baylor (37)
| Baylor, Wiley (13)
| —
| Los Angeles Memorial Sports Arena15,212
| 3–2
|- align="center" bgcolor="#ffcccc"
| 6
| April 9
| @ St. Louis
| L 113–121
| Elgin Baylor (39)
| Rudy LaRusso (11)
| Jerry West (4)
| Kiel Auditorium8,110
| 3–3
|- align="center" bgcolor="#ccffcc"
| 7
| April 11
| St. Louis
| W 115–100
| Elgin Baylor (35)
| Elgin Baylor (15)
| Baylor, West (7)
| Los Angeles Memorial Sports Arena14,864
| 4–3
|-

|- align="center" bgcolor="#ffcccc"
| 1
| April 14
| @ Boston
| L 114–117
| Elgin Baylor (33)
| Rudy LaRusso (14)
| three players tied (5)
| Boston Garden13,909
| 0–1
|- align="center" bgcolor="#ffcccc"
| 2
| April 16
| @ Boston
| L 106–113
| Elgin Baylor (30)
| Rudy LaRusso (12)
| Elgin Baylor (4)
| Boston Garden13,909
| 0–2
|- align="center" bgcolor="#ccffcc"
| 3
| April 17
| Boston
| W 119–99
| Jerry West (42)
| Elgin Baylor (23)
| Elgin Baylor (8)
| Los Angeles Memorial Sports Arena15,493
| 1–2
|- align="center" bgcolor="#ffcccc"
| 4
| April 19
| Boston
| L 105–108
| Elgin Baylor (31)
| Elgin Baylor (19)
| Jerry West (5)
| Los Angeles Memorial Sports Arena16,382
| 1–3
|- align="center" bgcolor="#ccffcc"
| 5
| April 21
| @ Boston
| W 126–119
| Elgin Baylor (43)
| Elgin Baylor (20)
| Jerry West (6)
| Boston Garden13,909
| 2–3
|- align="center" bgcolor="#ffcccc"
| 6
| April 24
| Boston
| L 109–112
| Jerry West (32)
| Gene Wiley (14)
| Jerry West (9)
| Los Angeles Memorial Sports Arena15,652
| 2–4
|-

Awards and records
 Elgin Baylor, All-NBA First Team
 Jerry West, All-NBA First Team
 Elgin Baylor, NBA All-Star Game
 Jerry West, NBA All-Star Game
 Rudy LaRusso, NBA All-Star Game

References

Los Angeles Lakers seasons
Los Angeles
Los Angle
Los Angle